Clan Ewing is a Highland clan which was historically based both in Dumbartonshire & Stirlingshire in the Lennox, and also in Cowal in Argyll, and which claims descent from Clan Ewen of Otter.

See also
Scottish clan
Clan MacEwen

References

External links
 Clan Ewing website
 Ewing Family Association website

Scottish clans
Armigerous clans